Henry Justice Ford (1860–1941) was a prolific and successful English artist and illustrator, active from 1886 through to the late 1920s. Sometimes known as H. J. Ford or Henry J. Ford, he came to public attention when he provided the numerous beautiful illustrations for Andrew Lang's Fairy Books, which captured the imagination of a generation of British children and were sold worldwide in the 1880s and 1890s.

Early years 
After education at Repton School and Clare College, Cambridge - where he gained a first class in the Classical Tripos in 1882 - Ford returned to London to study at the Slade School of Fine Art and later, at the Bushey School of Art, under the German-born Hubert von Herkomer.

Career 
In 1892, Ford began exhibiting paintings of historical subjects and landscapes at the Royal Academy of Art exhibitions. However it was his illustrations for such books as The Arabian Nights Entertainments (Longmans 1898), Kenilworth (TC & EC Jack 1900), and A School History of England by C. R. L. Fletcher and Rudyard Kipling (Clarendon Press 1911) that provided Ford with both income and fame.

Family 
His parents were Katherine Mary Justice and William Augustus Ford; his paternal grandfather was George Samuel Ford, a well known bill discounter. His father (a solicitor by profession) and many of his family were cricketers. His father wrote a number of articles and books on the subject, and Ford's brother, Francis Ford (1866-1940), played for England in an Ashes series in Australia.

At the age of 61, Ford surprised his friends by marrying a woman some thirty-five years younger.  She was Emily Amelia Hoff (née Rose), a widow whose first husband had been killed in the Battle of Neuve Chapelle in March 1915. Following the marriage in Kensington Register Office in February 1921, Henry and Emily Ford settled down in Bedford Gardens, Kensington for several years and, in 1927, the couple adopted a child, June Mary Magdelene Ford. The seated model in Henry Justice Ford's painting 'Remembering Happier Things', now in the collection of the Russell-Cotes Art Gallery, Bournemouth, bears a strong resemblance to Ford's wife, Emily.

Hobbies 
His love of the game led Henry Justice Ford to play cricket regularly with the playwright J.M. Barrie's Allahakbarrie Cricket Club.  This in turn led to Ford providing the well-known map of Kensington Gardens in Barrie's 'The Little White Bird.'  He also designed the costume for the character of Peter Pan when Barrie's play was staged in the West End for the first time in 1904.   Ford's wide-ranging interests brought him into contact and friendship with many well-known figures of his time, including the writers PG Wodehouse, Sir Arthur Conan Doyle, and AEW Mason.

Gallery

References

Further reading

External links

 
 
 
Works by Henry Justice Ford at Toronto Public Library
 

1860 births
1941 deaths
English illustrators
English children's book illustrators
19th-century illustrators of fairy tales